Pioneers in Petticoats is a 44-minute film produced by BYU Motion Picture Studios and distributed by the Church of Jesus Christ of Latter-day Saints. It was commissioned for the centennial of the founding of the Young Women's Mutual Improvement Association. In it, the main character, Abigail Harper, is chosen as the local president of the Young Women's Retrenchment Society and finds her values challenged.

References

External links

 
 

1969 in Christianity
1969 films
Films produced by the Church of Jesus Christ of Latter-day Saints
Young Women (organization)
Films directed by Wetzel Whitaker
1960s English-language films